Usynlig is the tenth studio album from the Norwegian band Tre Små Kinesere. The album was released in February 2014 and was the first album in the band's career not to feature pianist and founding member Øystein Hegge, who left the group in fall 2012. The literal translation of the album's title "Usynlig" is "Invisible" in English. According to frontman and principal songwriter Ulf Risnes the album's theme is about feeling invisible, the overlooked, and how we view and take in the world around us.

Track listing
All songs written by Ulf Risnes, except where noted.
«Babygrøt» – 3:07 – Ulf Risnes/Lars Lien
«Usynlig» – 2:38 – Ulf Risnes/Dag Erik Oksvold
«Ingenting virke» – 3:19 – Ulf Risnes/Øystein Hegge
«I dine sko» – 3:19
«Du går foran» – 2:51
«Du ska få en dommedag i morra» – 3:30
«Endelig» – 2:53
«Hør på pappa» – 3:18
«Puls» – 3:09
«Tredve varmegrader kaldt» – 3:50 – Risnes/Lien
«Viskelær» – 3:08
«Mennesket bak maska» – 4:11 – Ulf Risnes/Petter Jørgensen

Personnel
Ulf Risnes: Vocals, acoustic guitar, electric guitar, mandolin
Lars Lien: Piano, synthesizer, accordion, backing vocals
Eirik Øien: Bass
Dag Erik Oksvold: Drums, backing vocals

Additional personnel
Pål Brekkås: Engineer
Ulf Holand: Mixing
Thomas Henriksen: Mixing – «Tredve varmegrader kaldt»
Morten Stendal: Mastering

References

Norwegian pop music groups
Musical groups from Trondheim
2014 albums